Rally raid, also known as cross-country rallying, is a form of long distance off-road racing that takes place over several days. The length of the event can be as short as 2–3 days for a cross-country baja to as long as 15 days with marathon rallies like the Dakar Rally; with other cross-country rally events lasting 4–5 days. With skill in navigation being key, the driving skill and endurance of riders, drivers, co-drivers, and machines are put to the test. The total distance covered can be anywhere between 600 km to over 5,000 km with terrain ranging from sandy dunes, forest roads, mountain roads, and dry river beds; among others.

The most well known rally raid is the Dakar Rally; a marathon rally which can last anywhere from 10 to 15 days. Other prominent marathon rallies include the Africa Eco Race and Silk Way Rally. Well known examples of cross-country rallies include the Abu Dhabi Desert Challenge and Rallye du Maroc. The Baja Aragón is an example of a cross-country baja with the Baja Russia Northern Forest taking place entirely in snow. Other examples of rally raid races include the TransAnatolia Rally Raid, Hellas Rally Raid, Borneo Rally Raid, and Raid De Himalaya.

The first African rally raid run was the Côte-Côte Rally, first held in December 1976.

While the sport is most known for the Dakar Rally, a number of international and national series are also run. Internationally the World Rally-Raid Championship, co-sanctioned by the FIA and FIM, is the annual world championship for long-distance rally raid events; including the Dakar Rally. The shorter cross-country baja events are administered separately with the FIA World Cup for Cross-Country Bajas and FIM Bajas World Cup. National cross-country rally championships are held in Poland, Portugal, Russia, Spain, and South Africa, among others, while a Europe-based regional cup was introduced in 2021. For amateurs the Budapest-Bamako has been considered the world's largest amateur rally raid spanning two continents and 9,000 km.

Navigation
Navigation is primarily accomplished using a paper or digital roadbook in conjunction with a digital odometer to measure distance. The use of GPS or GPS-enabled devices, in contrast with desert racing, is not allowed. Competitors have no knowledge of the course until they receive the roadbook and any sort of pre-running is prohibited; which highlights the adventure aspect of rally raid. This is in stark contrast to rallying and desert racing where pre-running or reconnaissance is required or recommended for optimal performance on the course. The roadbook that is used is not as precise as the pacenotes used in stage rally, making navigation just as important as the driving. Bike and quad riders also have to navigate on their own while riding their vehicle; making concentration key during a rally raid event.

Vehicles and classes
Rally raid is made of various different categories and classes of vehicles. Regulations from the ASO, FIA, and FIM define the rules for each category.

Moto class 
The Moto class is divided between three groups: RallyGP, Rally2, and Rally3. RallyGP is the top moto class with riders and manufacturers eligible for the World Championship in FIM rankings. This class is only open to the most experienced competitors while Rally2 is available to any rider not considered RallyGP. Rally3 is for moto-enduro machines adapted for rally use. All three have a maximum capacity of 450cc. Rally2 and Rally3 are given World Cup status in the FIM-rankings.

Popular motorcycles include those made by KTM, Gasgas, Honda and Husqvarna because many of their bikes have finished in top positions. BMW motorcycles, Yamaha and Triumph have also been successful in the Dakar.

Quad class 
The class for quads was originally a sub-class for the larger moto-class, but has been given more prominence in recent years. The class also has World Cup status within the FIM.

Car class—T1 and T2 

The T1 Group is made up of Prototype Cross-Country Cars and is subdivided into four primary categories: T1.U, T1.1, T1.2, and T1.3. T1.U (T1 Ultimate) is a recent category built exclusively for vehicles running on renewable energies; such as the Audi RS Q e-tron. T1.1 (4x4) and T1.2 (4x2) are open to vehicles running on petrol and diesel fuels; including the Mini John Cooper Works Buggy, Toyota Hilux, and Peugeot 3008 DKR. Subclass T1.3 is open to vehicles conforming to SCORE regulations. This includes the Hummer H3 buggy and various other buggies.

The T2 category is open to Series Production Cross-Country Cars; primarily the Toyota Land Cruiser and Nissan Patrol.

Other prominent examples in the Car Class included the Mitsubishi Pajero/Montero, the Volkswagen Race Touareg, the Bowler Wildcat 200, the Mini All4 Racing and the Nissan Navara.

Lightweight and SSV class-T3 and T4 

While originally a sub-class under the car category and later a combined class; the T3 and T4 classes have been recently separated into their own respective categories.

T3 vehicles are officially described as Lightweight Prototype Cross-Country Vehicles and can include purpose-built machines such as the Red Bull OT3 and PH-Sport Zephyr while also allowing modified variations of vehicles built and sold by Polaris, Kawasaki, Yamaha, and Can-Am. The T4 category is for Modified Production Cross-Country Side-by-Side (SSV) vehicles; such as those built by Polaris and Can-Am, but built closer to production standards.

Both categories must weigh no more than 3500 kg and are eligible for their own respective FIA World Cups.

Truck class—T5 

While originally designated as Group T4; they have recently been solely given the T5 category with the T4 group now referring to Side by Side (UTV) vehicles.

Made up of both Prototype and Production Cross-Country Trucks; the class has been dominated by trucks built by Russian manufacturer Kamaz. Other competitors include Iveco, Hino, MAZ, Tatra, LIAZ, Mercedes-Benz Unimog, Renault Kerax, and various others. A FIA World Cup is awarded to drivers and co-drivers in this class.

Notable events
 World Rally-Raid Championship
FIA World Cup for Cross-Country Rallies (Defunct)
FIM Cross-Country Rallies World Championship (Defunct)
 FIA World Cup for Cross-Country Bajas
 FIA European Cup for Cross-Country Bajas 
 FIM Bajas World Cup
 Dakar Rally
 Africa Eco Race
 Silk Way Rally
 Abu Dhabi Desert Challenge
 Rallye OiLibya du Maroc
 Merzouga Rally
 Rallye des Pharaons
 2008 Central Europe Rally
 Budapest-Bamako – Largest amateur rally raid
 Baja Aragón
 Northern Forest
 Sonora Rally
 Rally Adventure Georgia
 Rimba Raid
 Rebelle Rally

References

 
Rallying
Auto racing by type
Motorcycle racing by type